Yangjicheon is a river of South Korea. It is a tributary of the Gyeongancheon in the Han River system. The stream has been the site of some environmental cleanup. Long polluted, fish and insects have returned.

References

Rivers of South Korea